Ice Mountain is a brand of bottled water from BlueTriton Brands, produced and marketed primarily in the Midwest region of the United States. Ice Mountain sources their water from two groundwater wells at Sanctuary Spring in Mecosta County, Michigan and/or Evart Spring in Evart, Michigan.  The water is drawn from underground springs using pump technology. Bottling is done at a plant in Stanwood, Michigan.

Water sourcing issues 
Ice Mountain has been part of the Great Lakes water use debate, in which diversion of the basin's primary and secondary water for export has been controversial. In 2004, a Michigan court ordered pumping of Sanctuary springs to cease. Nestlé has run into similar local opposition when trying to locate a new source location near the headwaters of the White River in the upper lower peninsula of Michigan. In 2017, Nestle applied for permits to increase production to 400 gallons (US) per minute. In 2019, a Michigan appellate court ruled that Nestle's Ice Mountain bottled water operation was not an essential public service, its bottled water was not a public water supply and Osceola Township was within its rights to deny the company zoning approval for a new booster pump station to move its water.

References

External links
 Official website
 

Bottled water brands
BlueTriton brands